Tou hou ji gei Yale Romanization, meaning Please Myself or  Ingratiate Oneself, (Cantonese: 討好自己; Tou hou zi gei Jyutping) is a 1994 Cantonese album recorded by Chinese Cantopop singer Faye Wong as 王靖雯 Wong Ching Man, when she was based in Hong Kong.

Cinepoly Records released this album in December, only a few months after her highly influential alternative music Cantonese album Random Thoughts and her second Mandarin album Sky. It did not match them in terms of commercial success.

Faye Wong composed the songs "Ingratiate Oneself" and "Exit" herself, and these continued her move into alternative music. The remaining songs were more conventional in genre.

The lyrics are all in Cantonese except for "Exit" in Mandarin.  She spoke rather than sang the words to this song, so that it is sometimes described as a rap. Somewhat pessimistic in outlook, it was not popular with all her fans. Nevertheless, it was a hit single, along with the title track, "Honeymoon" and the ballad "Brink of Love and Pain".

"Being Criminal" is a cover of "Here's Where the Story Ends" by the Sundays. "Sky Doesn't Change, Earth Changes" is the Cantonese version of "Amaranthine" (不變, Bù Biàn) on her Mandarin album Sky.

The album was released with three different album covers.

Track listing
討好自己 (Tou hou zigei) – "Please Myself"
蜜月期 (Mat jyut kei) – "Honeymoon"
為非作歹 (Wai fei zok daai) – "Being Criminal"
我怕 (Ngo pa) – "I Fear"
出路 (Chūlù) – "Exit"
平凡最浪漫 (Pingfaan zeoi longmaan) – "Simplicity Is Most Romantic"
飄 (Piu) – "Float"
愛與痛的邊緣 (Oi jyu tung dik binjyun) – "Brink of Love and Pain"
背影 (Bui jing) – "Shadow of Your Back" (or "Silhouette")
天不變地變 (Tin bat bin dei bin) – "Sky Invariably Changes"

References

External links
Ingratiate Oneself summary and translated lyrics 
 Ingratiate Oneself / Toe Ho Ji Gei summary at another extensive fan site

1994 albums
Faye Wong albums
Cinepoly Records albums
Cantopop albums